INS Sahyadri (F49) is a   stealth multi-role frigate built for the Indian Navy. This class features improved stealth and land attack capabilities over the preceding s.

Construction
 INS Sahyadri was built at the Mazagon Dock Limited (MDL) located in Mumbai. The keel of the vessel was laid on 30 September 2003 and was launched on 27 May 2005. It underwent sea trials in 2011–2012. From there it was commissioned on 21 July 2012 into the Eastern Naval Command headquartered at Visakhapatnam.

Service history

Miscellaneous 

INS Sahyadri was awarded the ‘Best Ship Trophy’ at the annual Fleet Awards functions five times namely in the years 2014-15, 2015-16, 2017-18, 2019-20 and 2020-21 and was also presented with Unit Citation in the year 2019-20 in Visakhapatnam. The ship is affiliated with Poona Horse, one of the oldest armoured regiments of the Indian Army.

References

Shivalik-class frigates
Frigates of the Indian Navy
2005 ships
Ships built in India